is a train station in Nichinan, Miyazaki Prefecture, Japan.

Lines

Layout 
The station consists of a side platform serving a single track at grade. A disused platform stands to the east of the track. The station building is a modern steel frame structure which houses a staffed ticket window and a waiting area. A bike shed and parking are available at the station forecourt.

JR Kyushu had planned to cease staffing the station. To maintain service to residents, the Nichinan City authorities took over the management of the ticket window as a kan'i itaku agent on 1 April 2015.

Adjacent stations

History
The line was then extended northwards in phases, reaching  by 1937. The track was extended further north with Kitagō opening as the northern terminus on 28 October 1941. Nichinan, at that time named , was one of several intermediate stations opened on the same day on the new track. The station was renamed Nichinan on 1 January 1952. The route was designated the Nichinan Line on 8 May 1963. With the privatization of JNR on 1 April 1987, the station came under the control of JR Kyushu.

Passenger statistics
In fiscal 2016, the station was used by an average of 256 passengers (boarding only) per day.

See also
List of railway stations in Japan

References

External links
Nichinan (JR Kyushu)

Railway stations in Miyazaki Prefecture
Railway stations in Japan opened in 1941